The Chronica Boemorum (Chronicle of the Czechs, or Bohemians) is the first Latin chronicle in which the history of the Czech lands has been consistently and relatively fully described. It was written in 1119–1125 by Cosmas of Prague.

The manuscript includes information about historical events in Czech land from ancient times to the first quarter of the 12th century. At the same time, the Chronicle is not limited to Czech national historiography, also revealing the relationship between various European states during the 10th–12th centuries.

The author of the chronicle had been known as the dean of the chapter of St. Vitus Cathedral in Prague Cosmas of Prague. Being a valuable historical source, especially as it relates to events whose contemporary was Cosmas, the Czech Chronicle in many respects set the direction for the subsequent development of the Czech annals. The chronicler worked on the chronicle until his death in 1125. Despite of some inaccuracies and a vivid expression of the author's own position, the scientific level is high for that era and the importance of the events described in it put Cosmas of Prague into one of the most significant chroniclers of medieval Europe.

The Chronica was continued by various, collectively called Cosmas's continuators, down to 1300.

Literature

External links
Chronica Boemorum — the chronicle accessible on-line at Monumenta Germaniae Historica

12th-century books
Latin-language literature
Czech chronicles